In projective geometry, an intersection theorem or incidence theorem is a statement concerning an incidence structure – consisting of points, lines, and possibly higher-dimensional objects and their incidences – together with a pair of objects  and  (for instance, a point and a line). The "theorem" states that, whenever a set of objects satisfies the incidences (i.e. can be identified with the objects of the incidence structure in such a way that incidence is preserved), then the objects  and  must also be incident. An intersection theorem is not necessarily true in all projective geometries; it is a property that some geometries satisfy but others don't.

For example, Desargues' theorem can be stated using the following incidence structure:
Points: 
Lines: 
Incidences (in addition to obvious ones such as ): 
The implication is then —that point  is incident with line .

Famous examples 
Desargues' theorem holds in a projective plane  if and only if  is the projective plane over some division ring (skewfield}  — . The projective plane is then called desarguesian.
A theorem of Amitsur and Bergman states that, in the context of desarguesian projective planes, for every intersection theorem there is a rational identity such that the plane  satisfies the intersection theorem if and only if the division ring  satisfies the rational identity.
Pappus's hexagon theorem holds in a desarguesian projective plane  if and only if  is a field; it corresponds to the identity .
Fano's axiom (which states a certain intersection does not happen) holds in  if and only if  has characteristic ; it corresponds to the identity .

References 

Incidence geometry
Theorems in projective geometry